Esquerda Unida, EU is the Galician federation of the Spanish left-wing political and social movement United Left. Yolanda Díaz, Minister of Labour and Social Economy, is the current General Coordinator. The PCG (Galician federation of PCE) is the major member of the coalition.

History
For the 2012 Galician elections, EU was one of the leading members of the coalition Galician Left Alternative that became the third-biggest party in the Galician Parliament, winning 9 seats, 5 of which were members of EU.

Current member parties
 Communist Party of Galicia
 Communist Youth of Galicia
 Open Left

See also
United Left (Spain)
Galician Left Alternative

References

References

External links
Official
Esquerda Unida

1986 establishments in Spain
Galicia
Political parties established in 1986
Socialist parties in Galicia (Spain)